Hitendra Wadhwa (born January 25, 1967) is an Indian-American businessman and educator. Wadhwa is currently a professor at Columbia Business School.  He is the founder of the Mentora Institute.

Early life and education 
Wadhwa was born in Chandigarh, India, to Puran Chand Wadhwa and Nirmal (née Sarup). 

Wadhwa received a bachelor's degree in mathematics from St. Stephens College, University of Delhi in 1988. He then received an M.B.A. and a Ph.D. from in management science from Sloan School of Management at Massachusetts Institute of Technology (MIT) by 1996. Wadhwa’s doctoral research focused on optimizing price decisions for retail products with seasonal demand patterns.

Career 
Wadhwa became a consultant at McKinsey & Company, a global management consulting firm, in 1996. In 1999, after raising $10 million in venture capital, he founded Paramark, a marketing optimization technology startup in Silicon Valley. The company was acquired by NewWorldIQ in 2002. Wadhwa also founded a consulting firm, Delphinity, in 2002, which through a series of mergers became the Mentora Institute.

Wadhwa first began teaching as a PhD. student at MIT in the 1990s. From 2004-2006, he served as an Adjunct Professor in Marketing at Wharton School of the University of Pennsylvania.

Wadhwa became a professor at Columbia Business School in 2006.  In 2007, Wadhwa oversaw Columbia Business School’s alliance with the Indian Institute of Management Ahmedabad.

Mentora Institute 
In 2011, Wadhwa launched the Mentora Institute to provide in-person and online leadership training and coaching for corporate executives. Teachings at the Mentora Institute are largely based on Wadhwa’s “Inner Mastery, Outer Impact” model originally developed at Columbia Business School. Wadhwa and the Mentora Institute launched the Mentora Foundation in 2021.

Publications 
Wadhwa's book, Inner Mastery, Outer Impact was released on June 7, 2022.

References

External links 
 Official Website

1967 births
Living people
People from Chandigarh
Indian emigrants to the United States
American people of Indian descent
American business executives
Businesspeople from Chandigarh
McKinsey & Company people
Indian company founders
Delhi University alumni
St. Stephen's College, Delhi alumni
MIT Sloan School of Management alumni
American bloggers
American motivational writers
21st-century American writers
Wharton School of the University of Pennsylvania faculty
Columbia University faculty
Columbia Business School faculty